Modification may refer to:

 Modifications of school work for students with special educational needs
 Modifications (genetics), changes in appearance arising from changes in the environment
 Posttranslational modifications, changes to proteins arising from protein biosynthesis
 Modding, modifying hardware or software
 Mod (video gaming)
 Modified car
 Body modification
 Grammatical modifier
 Home modifications
 Chemical modification, processes involving the alteration of the chemical constitution or structure of molecules

See also
 
 Modified (disambiguation)
 Modifier (disambiguation)
 Mod (disambiguation)
 Edit (disambiguation)
 Manipulation (disambiguation)